TIBER (Threat Intelligence Based Ethical Red Teaming) is a standard developed by the European Central Bank for Red Teaming. It can be adopted by member states of the European Union.

See also 

 ENISA

References

External links 

 

European Central Bank
Computer security standards